Leandro Damián Aguirre (born 8 February 1989) is an Argentine professional footballer who plays as a left-back.

Career
Aguirre's career began with Boca Juniors. He made his professional debut during the 2008–09 Argentine Primera División season, being substituted on at half-time of a victory away to Colón on 4 July 2009. Aguirre was loaned to Nacional of the Uruguayan Primera División in 2010, though returned to Boca Juniors soon after without featuring. 2011 saw Ben Hur sign Aguirre on loan. He was selected in one fixture in Torneo Argentino B while there. A third loan was confirmed on 30 June 2011, with Aguirre joining Primera B Nacional's Aldosivi. Fourteen appearances followed, before Aldosivi signed him permanently.

In July 2014, Aguirre moved to Independiente Rivadavia having scored one goal, versus Deportivo Merlo, in forty-six matches as a full Aldosivi player. His first appearance arrived during a home draw with Atlético Tucumán on 29 August. June 2016 saw Aguirre switch Argentina for Malta as he signed with reigning Premier League champions Valletta. His bow came in a UEFA Champions League qualifier with B36 Tórshavn, who they beat over two legs before being eliminated by Red Star Belgrade. He netted goals across the 2016–17 campaign against Balzan, Hamrun Spartans, Pembroke Athleta and Tarxien Rainbows.

Aguirre returned to his homeland with Gimnasia y Esgrima in August 2017. They won promotion from Torneo Federal A in his first season, as he went on to make forty-six appearances and score three goals in all competitions across the next two campaigns as a Primera B Nacional club. On 20 September 2020, Aguirre headed back to Maltese football for a second stint with Valletta. He scored on his competitive debut against Birkirkara a day later.

Career statistics
.

References

External links

1989 births
Living people
Footballers from Rosario, Santa Fe
Argentine footballers
Association football defenders
Argentine expatriate footballers
Expatriate footballers in Uruguay
Expatriate footballers in Malta
Argentine expatriate sportspeople in Uruguay
Argentine expatriate sportspeople in Malta
Argentine Primera División players
Torneo Argentino B players
Primera Nacional players
Maltese Premier League players
Torneo Federal A players
Boca Juniors footballers
Club Nacional de Football players
Club Sportivo Ben Hur players
Aldosivi footballers
Independiente Rivadavia footballers
Valletta F.C. players
Gimnasia y Esgrima de Mendoza footballers